Airpower Museum may refer to:

Airpower Museum (Antique Airfield), established in 1965 in Blakesburg, Iowa, U.S.
American Airpower Heritage Museum, an affiliate organization of the Commemorative Air Force (CAF), headquartered at Dallas Executive Airport in Dallas, Texas, U.S.
American Airpower Museum, established in 1998 at Republic Airport in East Farmingdale, New York, U.S.
CAF Airpower Museum, formerly located in Midland, Texas, U.S. (1991–2015)

See also
Aviation museum
List of aerospace museums
National Air and Space Museum, Washington, D.C, U.S.
Imperial War Museum Duxford, Cambridgeshire, England